Kenneth Abbott Viall  (December 19, 1893 – January 3, 1974) was born in Lynn, Massachusetts as the only son of Frederick Clarence Viall and Edith Laura (Robbins) Viall. He received his A.B. from Harvard College in 1915, and B.D. from the General Theological Seminary, New York, in 1919. He received an M.A. from the Harvard Graduate School of Education in 1920, and an Ed.M. in 1921. He received an honorary S.T.D. from General Seminary in 1949.

Viall was ordained to the diaconate on April 21, 1918, and to the priesthood on January 7, 1919. He was professed in the Society of St. John the Evangelist on December 19, 1923, and assigned to the SSJE's house in Korea. He soon returned to California and served at the Church of the Advent, San Francisco from 1924–1935.

He was assigned to the SSJE house in Japan in 1934, and served as Provincial Superior of the SSJE in Japan from 1938 until his death. (He was on furlough from 1940–1947 at the society's house in Cambridge during World War II.) He was consecrated suffragan Bishop of Tokyo on April 25, 1949, and retired on the consecration of Bishop Goto on November 6, 1959.

Viall is buried at St. Michael's Monastery, Oyama, Tochigi Prefecture.

References
 Obituary, Cowley, January 1974, pp. 55–56.
 Yokohama Christ Church History

External links
 The Daily Offices and Eucharistic Liturgy in Rōmaji, foreword by Bishop Viall, digitized by Richard Mammana

People from Lynn, Massachusetts
1893 births
1974 deaths
20th-century Anglican bishops in Asia
Harvard Graduate School of Education alumni
Harvard College alumni
General Theological Seminary alumni
Anglican bishops of Tokyo
20th-century American clergy